Limnae or Limnai was a town of ancient Pamphylia, inhabited during Roman times.

Its site is located near Yalnızbağ Değirmen, in Asiatic Turkey.

References

Populated places in ancient Pamphylia
Former populated places in Turkey
Roman towns and cities in Turkey
History of Antalya Province